Peter Mayhew was a British film editor.

Selected filmography
 Down Among the Z Men (1952)
 Forces' Sweetheart (1953)
 Flannelfoot (1953)
 The Colditz Story (1955)
 Assignment Redhead (1956)
 West of Suez (1957)
 Man from Tangier (1958)
 Grip of the Strangler (1958)
 Corridors of Blood (1958)

References

External links
 

Date of birth unknown
Date of death unknown
Year of birth missing
Year of death missing
British film editors